Pax Indica: India and the World in the Twenty-first Century is a 2012 non-fiction book written by Shashi Tharoor, about India's foreign policy.

Summary 
Tharoor emphasizes the significance and impact of globalization for India's society, and states that the primary objective of India's foreign policy must be to protect the process of domestic, social and economic transformation, by working for a benign environment that will ensure India’s security and bring in global support for efforts to build and change the country for the better.

In the first seven chapters, he analyzes the geopolitical situation of various regions of the world, including Pakistan, South Asia, China, the Middle East, the West, Africa, and Latin America. The bulk of it consists of a brief history of India's relationship with that country, and numerous conflicts, disputes, and solutions are discussed. 

In the last four chapters, he gives his recommendations. The concepts of 'soft power' and 'hard power' are talked about, and he weighs in the pros and cons of these two ways of influencing foreign policy and diplomacy. A fan of soft power, he believes that India should use a combination of soft power and public diplomacy in this multi aligned world to achieve her objectives.

Reception
In a review of the book, Aditya Menon stated in the weekly Indian English-language news magazine  India Today  magazine that "...Pax Indica promises to be a seminal work on Indian diplomacy" and that "Tharoor covers almost every possible aspect of the foreign policy challenges before the country in the 21st century", providing insights on "India's relations with the US, Pakistan, the UN". However, he does not treat India's relations with Iran and China in depth. In this lively and informative work, Shashi Tharoor demonstrates how Indian diplomacy has become active and where it needs to focus in the world of the 21st century.

References

2012 non-fiction books
Books about politics of India
English-language books
Foreign relations of India
Indian books
Penguin Books India books
Allen Lane (imprint) books